USA-192, also known as GPS IIR-16(M), GPS IIRM-3 and GPS SVN-58, is an American navigation satellite which forms part of the Global Positioning System. It was the third of eight Block IIRM satellites to be launched, and the sixteenth of twenty one Block IIR satellites overall. It was built by Lockheed Martin, using the AS-4000 satellite bus.

USA-192 was launched at 19:12:00 UTC on 17 November 2006, atop a Delta II carrier rocket, flight number D321, flying in the 7925-9.5 configuration. The launch took place from Space Launch Complex 17A at the Cape Canaveral Air Force Station, and placed USA-192 into a transfer orbit. The satellite raised itself into medium Earth orbit using a Star-37FM apogee motor.

It is used to broadcast the PRN 12 signal, and operates in slot 4 of plane B of the GPS constellation. As of 2019 it remains in service.

References

Spacecraft launched in 2006
GPS satellites
USA satellites